Skeaf railway station was on the Ballinascarthy and Timoleague Junction Light Railway in County Cork, Ireland.

History

The station opened on 20 December 1890.

Passenger services were withdrawn on 24 February 1947.

Routes

Further reading

References

Disused railway stations in County Cork
Railway stations opened in 1890
Railway stations closed in 1947